This article presents a timeline of events related to popular free/open-source software. For a narrative explaining the overall development, see the related history of free and open-source software.

The Achievements column documents achievements a project attained at some point in time (not necessarily when it was first released).

1970s

1980s

1990s

2000s

By the 2000s the number of open source software packages in wide use was so large that it would be infeasible to make a definitive list.

2010s

2020s

See also
 History of free and open-source software
 List of free and open-source software packages
 Timeline of programming languages – many programming languages are open source
 Timeline of operating systems – quite a few operating systems are open source
 Timeline of Linux adoption
 History of Linux
 Linux kernel#History

References

External links
 A brief history of open-source software

 
Open-source software